Flirty Four-Flushers is a 1926 comedy silent film produced by Mack Sennett and starred by Eddie Cline and Billy Bevan. Carl Harbaugh wrote the reelers of the film. It was distributed by Pathé. It was released on December 26, 1926.

Peaches and Plumbers gave Bevan a chance to display his acting talent, and also both films were an even better showcase for Madeline Hurlock.

Locations included Palisades Park, Ocean Blvd., Santa Monica, Hotel St. Catherine, Avalon and Catalina. It is a remake of A Summer Tragedy (1910) and it is based on O. Henry. Ruth Hiatt was originally considered for a role.

Cast
 Madeline Hurlock as Aggie Horton / Muriel Marlboro
 Billy Bevan as Jerry Connors / Archibald De Shyster
 Vernon Dent as Bill Brown
 Stanley Blystone as Joe, Aggie's Sweetheart
 Billy Gilbert as Soup Drinking Customer / Hotel Desk Clerk
 Thelma Hill as Bill Brown's Fiancée
 Ruth Taylor as Slumming Girl
 Leonora Summers as Gertie, the waitress
 Eleanor Hibbard as Newspaper Stand Clerk
 Evelyn Sherman as Slumming Mother
 Warren Burke as Slumming Boyfriend
 Eugene Jackson as Boy Eating Watermelon
 William McCall as Hotel Manager
 Art Rowlands as Slumming Man with Moustache
 William Searby as Customer Who Wants Ketchup
 Alice Ward

References

Bibliography

External links

Films directed by Edward F. Cline
Films produced by Mack Sennett
1926 comedy films
1926 films
Silent American comedy films
American silent short films
American black-and-white films
Surviving American silent films
1920s American films